Nikolai Smirnov may refer to:
 Nikolai Ivanovich Smirnov (1917–1992), Soviet Navy Admiral, Hero of the Soviet Union
 Nikolai Mikhailovich Smirnov, Governor of the Saint Petersburg Governorate, 1855–1861

 Nikolai Smirnov (cinematographer), Soviet film cinematographer that shot Aerograd
 Nikolai Smirnov (water polo) (born 1961), Soviet water polo player who participated in the 1988 Olympics
 Nikolai Smirnov (mathematician) (1900–1966), Soviet mathematician
 Nikolai Ivanovich Smirnov (?–?), head of the Office of the Secretariat of the Central Committee of the Russian Communist Party (Bolsheviks)

See also
 Smirnov (surname)
 Smirnoff (surname)